A vinyl cutter is an entry level machine for making signs. Computer designed vector files with patterns and letters are directly cut on the roll of vinyl which is mounted and fed into the vinyl cutter through USB or serial cable. Vinyl cutters are mainly used to make signs, banners and advertisements. Advertisements seen on automobiles and vans are often made with vinyl cut letters. While these machines were designed for cutting vinyl, they can also cut through computer and specialty papers, as well as thicker items like thin sheets of magnet.

In addition to sign business, vinyl cutters are commonly used for apparel decoration.  To decorate apparel, a vector design needs to be cut in mirror image, weeded, and then heat applied using a commercial heat press or a hand iron for home use.

Some businesses use their vinyl cutter to produce both signs and custom apparel. Many crafters also have vinyl cutters for home use. These require little maintenance and the vinyl can be bought in bulk relatively cheaply.

Vinyl cutters are also often used by stencil artists to create single use or reusable stencil art and lettering

How it works
A vinyl cutter is a type of computer-controlled machine. Small vinyl cutters look like a desktop printer. Like a printer controls a nozzle, the computer controls the movement of a sharp blade over the surface of the material.  This blade is used to cut out shapes and letters from sheets of thin self-adhesive plastic (vinyl). The vinyl can then be stuck to a variety of surfaces depending on the adhesive and type of material.

To cut out a design, a vector-based image must be created using vector drawing software. Some vinyl cutters are marketed to small in-home businesses and require download and use of a proprietary editing software.  The design is then sent to the cutter where it cuts along the vector paths laid out in the design. The cutter is capable of moving the blade on an X and Y axis over the material, cutting it into any shape imaginable.  Since the vinyl material comes in long rolls, projects with significant length like banners or billboards can be easily cut as well.

The one major limitation with vinyl cutters is that they can only cut shapes from solid colours of vinyl, paper, card or thin plastic sheets such as Mylar plastic. The type and thickness of material will vary for each cutter and how much downforce the cutter is capable of. If the material has no backing, a backing sheet, material or cutting mat and a temporary adhesive are needed to allow the cutter to cut through the material.

A design with multiple colours must have each colour cut separately and then layered on top of each other as it is applied to the substrate. This is a process that is often applied in stencil art. Also, since the shapes are cut out of solid colours, photographs and gradients cannot be reproduced with a stand alone cutter.

Design Creation
Computer designed images are loaded onto the vinyl cutter via a wired connection or over a wireless protocol, such as Wi-Fi or Bluetooth. Then the vinyl is loaded into the machine where it is automatically fed through and cut to follow the set design. The vinyl can be placed on an adhesive mat to stabilize the vinyl when cutting smaller designs.

Types of Vinyl 
Heat transfer vinyl is the type of vinyl used to apply a design to fabric including t-shirts, tea towels, canvas bags, and more. Heat Transfer vinyl can be applied using a heat press or an iron, though the constant pressure and heat from a heat press is recommended by experts.

Adhesive Vinyl is the type of vinyl used for store windows, car decals, signage, and more.  Adhesive vinyl is applied with a transfer medium often called "Transfer Tape" or "Carrier Sheet".

Using Other Materials 
In addition to vinyl some cutters are capable of cutting other materials such as paper, card, plastic sheets and even thin wood. The thickness and type of material that can be cut will depend on the model of the cutter and heavily depends on the downforce. Cricut is a popular home cutter used by arts and craft enthusiasts since it allows for a wide use of different materials and is similar in size to a household printer and has strong downforce for its size.

Backing and Cutting Mat 
If you cut material that doesn't have an adhesive backing you will require a cutting mat that you need to attach your material to. Some cutting mats are sticky, others will require you to use a temporary adhesive and/or masking tape to keep the material in place when cutting.

Cutting
The vinyl cutter uses a small knife to precisely cut the outline of figures into a sheet or piece of vinyl, but not the release liner. The knife moves side to side and turns, while the vinyl is moved beneath the knife. The results from the cut process is an image cut into the material.

Weeding
The material is then 'weeded' where the excess parts of the figures are removed from the release liner. It is possible to remove the positive parts, which would give a negative decal, or remove the negative parts, giving a positive decal. Removing the figure would be like removing the positive, giving a negative image of the figures.

Transfer Tape
A sheet of transfer tape with an adhesive backing is laid on the weeded  vinyl when necessary.  Heat Transfer vinyl often does not require use of a separate transfer tape.  A roller is applied to the tape, causing it to adhere to the vinyl.  The transfer tape and the weeded vinyl is pulled off the release liner, and applied to a substrate, such as a sheet of aluminium.  This results in an aluminium sign with vinyl figures.

Uses
In addition to the capabilities of the cutter itself, adhesive vinyl comes in a wide variety of colors and materials including gold and silver foil, vinyl that simulates frosted glass, holographic vinyl, reflective vinyl, thermal transfer material, and even clear vinyl embedded with gold leaf. (Often used in the lettering on fire trucks and rescue vehicles.) As the vinyl film is supplied by the manufacturer, it comes attached to a release liner.

See also 
 Laser cutter

References

Computer hardware
Computing output devices
Cutting tools